is a Japanese international school in Surco, Lima, Peru. It serves elementary and junior high school levels.

The リマ日本語講習会 opened in 1969. The Instituto Nacional de Cultura of Peru gave approval for the establishment of the day school in June 1971.

Notable alumni
Toshiki Koike, footballer
Takashi Satou, photographer

See also
 Japanese Peruvian
Peruvian schools in Japan:
 Mundo de Alegría - Hamamatsu
 Colegio Hispano Americano de Gunma - Isesaki, Gunma

References

Further reading

 Sugimoto, Hiroshi (杉本 裕司) and 全国海外子女教育・国際理解教育研究協議会. インカの響き風爽やか : ペルー・リマ日本人学校通信. （国際理解教育選書シリーズ） 創友社, 2008.7. . See profile at CiNii.
 横丁 郁朗. "海外勤務での伝染性肝炎は労災か?--リマ日本人学校教員が公務上申請." Safety & Health (いのちと健康) 1993(11), p2-11, 1993-10. 労働教育センタ-. See profile at CiNii.

From people affiliated with the school:
 亀井 隆司 (リマ日本人学校). "リマ日本人学校での取り組み" (Archive). 平成22年度派遣.  

Books from the school:
 "コノスカモスペルー: リマ日本人学校社会科副読本資料集." リマ日本人学校運営委員会, 1990. See profile at Google Books.

External links
  Asociación Academia de Cultura Japonesa
  Profile from Tottori Prefecture: http://www.pref.tottori.lg.jp/secure/302904/rima1.pdf
 http://www.minedu.gob.pe/files/762_201111151706.pdf

Peru
International schools in Lima
Private schools in Peru